Cullumia is a genus of flowering plants in the family Asteraceae.

 Species
All the species are endemic to the Cape Province region of South Africa.

References

Asteraceae genera
Arctotideae
Endemic flora of South Africa
Taxa named by Robert Brown (botanist, born 1773)